Austria's Next Topmodel, season 1 was the first season of the Austrian reality documentary based on Tyra Banks America's Next Top Model.
The host of the show was Lena Gercke, the first winner of GNTM who is also the first winner of a Top Model franchise that later becomes a host of another Top Model show. The jury consisted of the head of Vienna-based agency Wiener Models Andrea Weidler and Dutch-born runway coach Alamande Belfor.

The show caused some controversy, as it was discovered that Tamara Puljarevic, one of the contestants, applied under her father's surname to hide her identity of being the daughter of Svetlana Puljarevic, who is the executive chief of Miss magazine, on whose cover the winner would eventually be featured. She eventually made it to the 2nd runner-up-position but was ultimately surpassed by 16-year-old Larissa Marolt, who was named the first Austria's Next Topmodel and went on to compete on the fourth season of Germany's Next Topmodel hosted by Heidi Klum.

Contestants
(ages stated are at start of contest)

Episodes

I am from Austria
Title translation: "I am from Austria"
Original airdate: January 9, 2009

Guest judges: Sabine Landl & Thang de Hoo

Küss die Hand, schöne Frau

Title translation: "Kiss the hand, beautiful lady"
Original airdate: January 15, 2009

Challenge winners: Larissa Marolt & Victoria Hooper
Bottom two: Birgit Königstorfer & Piroschka Khyo
Eliminated: Piroschka Khyo
Featured photographer: Sepp Gallauer
Guest judges: Sabine Landl & Sepp Gallauer

Es lebe der Sport
Title translation: "Long lives the sport"
Original airdate: January 22, 2009

Challenge winner: Constanzia Delort-Laval
Casting winner: Julia Mähder
Featured photographer: Gery Keszler & Andreas Bitesnich
Guest judge: Stefan Maierhofer

Out of the dark
Title translation: "Out of the dark"
Original airdate:  January 26, 2009

Bottom two: Birgit Königstorfer & Kim Sade-Tiroch
Eliminated: Birgit Königstorfer
Bottom three: Christiane Pliem, Constanzia Delort-Laval & Kordula Stöckl
Eliminated: Christiane Pliem & Kordula Stöckl
Challenge winners: Constanzia Delort-Laval, Kordula Stöckl, Tamara Puljarevic & Victoria Hooper
Guest judge: Domenique Melchior

Schickeria
Original airdate: January 29, 2009

Bottom two: Julia Mähder & Tamara Puljarevic
Eliminated: Julia Mähder
Challenge winner: Constaniza Delort-Laval & Julia Mähder
Guest judge: Eva Dichand & Gery Keszler

Engel fliegen einsam
Title translation: "Angels fly alone"
Original airdate:  February 2, 2009

Bottom three: Constanzia Delort-Laval, Kim Sade-Tiroch & Larissa Marolt
Eliminated: Kim Sade-Tiroch
Challenge winner: Larissa Marolt
Featured photographers: Mato Johannik & Mike Asato
Guest judge: Julia Wagner

Dies Bildnis ist bezaubernd schön
Title translation: "This portrait is enchantingly beautiful"
Original airdate: February 5, 2009

Bottom two: Constanzia Delort-Laval & Tamara Puljarevic
Eliminated: Constanzia Delort-Laval
Bottom two: Larissa Marolt & Tamara Puljarevic
Eliminated: Tamara Puljarevic
Final two: Larissa Marolt & Victoria Hooper
Austria's Next Topmodel: Larissa Marolt
Featured photographer: Rafaela Pröll
Guest judge: Atil Kutoglu

Summaries

Call-out order

 The contestant won the reward challenge and was immune from elimination
 The contestant was eliminated
 The contestant won the competition

Episodes 3 and 5 ended with a cliffhanger and the elimination was shown in the following episode

Photo shoot guide
 Episode 1 photo shoot:  Cobenzl runway 
 Episode 2 photo shoot:  Casual attire
 Episode 3 photo shoot: Life Ball's style bible; skiing snow queens 
 Episode 4 photo shoot: Body painting
 Episode 5 photo shoot: Chrystal worlds calendar
 Episode 6 photo shoots: Miss covers; made in Austria
 Episode 7 photo shoots: Swarovski campaign; tradition trifft moderne

Judges
Lena Gercke (Host)
Andrea Weidler
Alamande Belfor

References

External links
 Official website

Austria's Next Topmodel
2000s Austrian television series
2009 Austrian television seasons
German-language television shows
Television shows filmed in Austria
Television shows filmed in Italy

de:Austria’s Next Topmodel